Schlatter is a surname. Notable people with the surname include:

Adolf Schlatter (1852–1938), German evangelical theologian and professor
Carl B. Schlatter (1864–1934), Swiss surgeon after whom Osgood–Schlatter disease is named
Charlie Schlatter (born 1966), American actor
Dustin Schlatter, American wrestler
Francis Schlatter (1856–1896), Alsatian cobbler who, because of miraculous cures attributed to him, became known as the Healer
George Schlatter (born 1932), American television producer and director
Michael Schlatter (1716–1790), German Reformed minister who worked in the US
Peter Schlatter (born 1968), German judoka
Victor Schlatter, nuclear scientist, church planter, missionary, and author

See also
Osgood–Schlatter disease, inflammation of the growth plate at the tibial tuberosity